Iddon is a surname. Notable people with the surname include:

Brian Iddon (born 1940), British politician
Christian Iddon (born 1985), British motorcycle racer
Jack Iddon (1902–1946), British cricketer
Richard Iddon (1901–1975), British footballer